Hell Den is an adult animated sketch comedy series that premiered on May 10, 2019 on the internet platform DrinkTV and later moved to Syfy's late-night programming block, TZGZ. The second season premiered on November 7, 2020.

Plot
After an Uber-Apocalypse wipes out civilization, only one person miraculously survives: 12 year-old Andrew. With the last working TV and VCR in existence, he invites a motley group of apocalyptic creatures into his house to watch weird cartoons and old movies.

Cast and characters
Sean Cowhig as Fleek
Neil Garguilo as Andrew
Brian James O'Connell as Giantic
David F. Park as Kenneth
Justin Ware as Bet-C

Episodes

Season 1 (2019)

Season 2 (2020)

References

External links 
 

2019 web series debuts
2010s American adult animated television series
2010s American animated comedy television series
2010s American sketch comedy television series
2020s American adult animated television series
2020s American animated comedy television series
2020s American sketch comedy television series
American adult animated comedy television series
Syfy original programming
TZGZ
Animated television series about children
English-language television shows